Doom+5 is a 2015 Hong Kong television series produced by Hong Kong Television Network. The first episode premiered on 15 June 2015.

Synopsis 
On 5:40 a.m. January 23rd, 2017, a hacker hacked into the Hong Kong government's supercomputers and pirated a confidential document. The report is from NASA, stating that a large solar flare will completely destroy the Earth on 11:45 p.m. on that same date. The report is leaked to 137 Hong Kong residents' email addresses. The Hong Kong government then held the 137 people hostage, and release each person as they deem sane, perhaps to prevent the news from being spread amongst the community and cause chaos. Five of those released are shown how they will live their final hours before the end of the world.

Cast

SAR Government
 Sunny Chan as Chief Executive
  as Chief Secretary
  as Financial Secretary
  as Secretary for Justice

Episode 1: Commitment
 Philip Keung as Law Dai-wai
 Rachel Lam as Chan Kam-tai
  as Kam Fa
 Adrian Wong as Mang Mang
 Jacky Yeung as Cheng Sai-cheong
  as Boss

Episode 2: Resurrection
  as Lee Yat-choi
  as young Lee Yat-choi
 Peter Lai as Lee Tung-shing
  as Cheung Ka-yan
  as young Cheung Ka-yan
 Wu Kwing-lung as Sam
  as doctor

Episode 3: Monica
  as Yau Mei-ling
  as young Yau Mei-ling
  as Monica Lam
 Vivian Lee as young Monica Lam
 Kathy Yuen as Ceci
  as Kwan Chung
  as young Kwan Chung

Episode 4: Betrayal
  as George Leung
  as To Tung
  as Siu Yin-tsz
  as Fiona
  as Fong Wai-yee
 Tammy Ho as Sa Sa
  as Yip Kai-fat
 Candy Chu as pregnant woman

Episode 5: Guardian
 Gregory Wong as Cheung Tsz-lok
 Yetta Tse as Wong Ning
  as Sai Kai
 Casper Chan as Makeup store clerk

Production
Filming started on 16 January 2014.

Release
A 7-minute preview was released on HKTV's YouTube channel on 8 June 2015.

Song list
 "Come Back to Me" (Episode 4)

References

External links
 Official website

Hong Kong Television Network original programming
2015 Hong Kong television series debuts
2010s Hong Kong television series